John Hartson (born 5 April 1975) is a Welsh former professional footballer, coach and sports television pundit for S4C, Sky Sports, Premier Sports TV and BT Sport.

As a player he was a striker, notably for Scottish club Celtic where his time with the Hoops saw three Scottish Premier League titles. Hartson also played in the Premier League with Arsenal, West Ham United, Wimbledon, Coventry City and West Bromwich Albion, and in the Football League for Luton Town and Norwich City.

Hartson earned 51 international caps for Wales, scoring 14 goals. He later held the position of head coach for Wales's strikers.

Early life
John Hartson was born on 5 April 1975 in Swansea, the third of four children to Cyril and Diana Hartson. Cyril had played football for local team Afan Lido. Hartson grew up in Talycoppa, Swansea, alongside his elder brother James, elder sister Hayley and younger sister Victoria. As a youngster Hartson represented Lonlas Boys' Club in Skewen, playing his first match aged six. He joined Luton Town's Youth Training Scheme at the age of sixteen but was suspended four months later for stealing a bank card from the son of a couple with whom he was lodging. He used the card to withdraw £50 in order to fund his gambling addiction. Hartson was suspended and sent home to Swansea but was reinstated by Luton shortly afterwards and allowed to resume his apprenticeship.

Club career

Luton Town and Arsenal
Hartson turned professional in 1992 and made his Luton Town first team debut as a substitute in a 1–0 League Cup defeat to Cambridge United on 24 August 1993. In January 1995, at 19, he joined Arsenal for £2.5 million, a British record fee for a teenage player at the time.
Along with Chris Kiwomya, Hartson was one of George Graham's last signings before the manager's sacking in February 1995. He made his Arsenal debut on 14 January 1995, a 1–1 home draw with Everton, and scored his first goal for the club the following week, the only goal in a 1–0 away win at Coventry City. He was a regular for the remainder of his first season, a highlight of which was scoring Arsenal's 75th-minute equaliser in the 1995 UEFA Cup Winners' Cup Final against Real Zaragoza; however a last-minute goal from 40 yards by Nayim over David Seaman meant Arsenal lost the game 2–1. He was strike-partner to Ian Wright, being favoured ahead of Kevin Campbell to fill the gap left by the injured Alan Smith, who retired at the end of the season.

Following the signing of Dennis Bergkamp, who was preferred up front to partner Wright, Hartson went on to feature under Graham's successors Bruce Rioch and Arsène Wenger. With Wenger wanting him to stay at the
club, Hartson though in February 1997 linked up with West Ham United in a £3.2 million deal. At the time, he was the most expensive player to be signed by West Ham. The deal was initially reported to be worth £5 million.

In total, Hartson played 53 times for Arsenal, scoring 14 goals.

West Ham United
Hartson made his debut for West Ham on 15 February 1997 alongside another new signing, Paul Kitson. West Ham lost 1–0 to Derby County and Hartson was booked. His first West Ham goal came in his next following game on 24 February 1997, a 4–3 home win over Tottenham Hotspur. In his first season, he scored five league goals from eleven games and was instrumental in helping West Ham rise from 18th when he joined to a final league position for 1996–97 season of 14th. The next season saw Hartson finish, with 24 goals in 42 games in all competitions, as West Ham's top scorer. Hartson's goal tally was in all a considerable margin ahead of the next highest scorer, Eyal Berkovic with nine goals. He was also the second highest scorer, behind Andy Cole in the Premier League in that season. In the 1998 close season, Manchester United chairman Martin Edwards and assistant manager Brian Kidd expressed their desire for Hartson to sign for Manchester United to manager Alex Ferguson. However, Ferguson decided against making a bid for Hartson. In a training ground incident in September 1998, Hartson kicked West Ham teammate Eyal Berkovic in the face, after the Israeli midfielder had punched Hartson in the leg as he attempted to help Berkovic to his feet. The incident was captured on camera. Hartson was fined and admitted in his biography that it was an error of judgement. Berkovic said of the incident "If my head had been a ball, it would have been in the top corner of the net".

His form suffered and he managed only four goals from twenty games in season 1998–99. His final game on 13 January 1999, saw West Ham lose 1–0 in an FA Cup tie against his hometown club, Swansea City.

Hartson played 73 times and scored 33 goals for the east London club.

Wimbledon
Hartson joined Wimbledon in January 1999, becoming the club's most expensive signing ever at £7.5m. His time with the Dons was marred by injury, though he still managed a respectable goal tally, first in the Premier League, then the First Division following the club's relegation in 2000. Proposed moves to Rangers, Tottenham and Charlton fell through due to doubts over the player's fitness. Hartson instead joined Coventry City on a pay-for-play deal in February 2001.

Coventry City
Hartson made his Coventry debut against former club West Ham on 12 February 2001. He went on to score six goals in twelve league games, including a brace in a defeat to Manchester United at Old Trafford. However, despite his efforts Coventry were relegated from the Premier League at the end of the season.

Celtic

In August 2001, Hartson joined Celtic in a £6m transfer. He made his debut on 4 August 2001, coming on as a substitute in a league match away at Kilmarnock. He scored his first goals for Celtic when he scored a hat-trick in a 5–1 win over Dundee United on 20 October 2001. At the end of his first season at Celtic he helped them win the Scottish Premier League title.

In December 2002, Hartson scored as Celtic were beaten 2–1 in the away leg of their third round UEFA Cup tie against Celta Vigo. However, with the aggregate score 2–2, Celtic progressed on the away goals rule. This was the first time that Celtic had remained in European competition after Christmas since 1980. In March 2003, Celtic faced Liverpool in the UEFA Cup at the quarter final stage, drawing 1–1 in Glasgow.
In the return leg at Anfield, Hartson fired the club's goal of the season with a strike past Jerzy Dudek into the top corner from over 25 yards out. Celtic won this match 2–0, progressing to the semi-final. After scoring the winning goal against Rangers at Ibrox in late April Hartson was plagued by a back injury which meant he missed the rest of the season, including the 2003 UEFA Cup Final. Nevertheless, he had played a major role in getting Celtic all the way through the tournament, with his goals in Liverpool and Vigo, as well as several assists. Celtic were defeated 3–2 in the final after extra time by José Mourinho's FC Porto.

In March 2004, he dropped out for the remainder of the football season for surgery to his back; however, he recovered in time for Wales' unsuccessful qualifying campaign for the 2006 World Cup. Celtic went on to win the 2003–04 Scottish Cup and the 2003-04 title in his absence.

In April 2005 he shared the Scottish PFA Players' Player of the Year award with Fernando Ricksen and in May he was voted the Scottish Football Writers' Association Player of the Year. He played as Celtic won the 2005 Scottish Cup Final.

On 6 November 2005 Hartson scored his 100th goal for Celtic against Falkirk. He missed Celtic's victory in the 2006 Scottish League Cup Final through suspension. He scored the only goal against Hearts, on 5 April 2006, his 31st birthday to clinch the title for Celtic.

Hartson was sent off on a number of occasions, one being a notable dismissal towards the end of an Old Firm derby, when he was sent off for violent conduct along with Celtic teammate Johan Mjällby and Rangers player Fernando Ricksen. Hartson's dismissal was overturned on appeal.

Due to the close bond Hartson felt with both Celtic Football Club and their fans, he has a tattoo of a large Celtic crest on his upper arm with the words 'You'll Never Walk Alone' underneath in honour of the song which Celtic fans sing ahead of big games. After a picture of the tattoo appeared on the internet and many Celtic F.C. forums, Hartson tweeted that the tattoo was real and in honour of the support he had received from Celtic fans during his illness. The tweet read, "Yes my Celtic tattoo is real I had it done soon as I came out of hospital after the support I was given by the whole Celtic family."

West Bromwich Albion
On 26 June 2006, Hartson signed a two-year contract with English Football League Championship side West Bromwich Albion in a £500,000 move. Hartson scored twice on his Albion debut in a 2–0 Hawthorns win against Hull City on 5 August 2006.

On 31 August 2007, The Times said that Hartson had signed for League One club Nottingham Forest on a loan move. On 5 September 2007, the Western Mail reported that Hartson had rejected a firm approach from Forest and was on the verge of signing for his hometown club Swansea City on loan. However the club quickly issued a statement on its website denying the striker was set to sign.

In October 2007 Hartson joined Norwich City on a month's loan. Although Norwich had the option to extend the loan until 31 December, newly appointed manager Glenn Roeder decided to send Hartson back to the Midlands after the initial month period. He then rejected an offer to join Chester City on loan. In January 2008 Hartson was released by West Bromwich Albion, six months before the end of his contract.

On 7 February 2008, Hartson announced his retirement from football, citing his long-term struggles with weight and fitness as major reasons for finishing his career.

International career
Hartson won 51 first team caps for Wales, scoring 14 goals. He is currently the 11th highest scorer of all time for the Welsh.

He also holds a record for the Wales U21 team by being one of only four people to have scored a hat-trick at that level alongside Craig Davies, Lee Jones and Ched Evans.

Hartson retired from international football in February 2006 in order to concentrate on his career with Celtic but in August that year he stated that he would come out of retirement to play if John Toshack needed him.

Media career
Just a few weeks after his retirement from playing, East Stirlingshire in the Scottish Football League Third Division offered Hartson the chance to succeed Gordon Wylde as manager, but Hartson rejected the opportunity, saying that, "the timing is just not right for me at the moment." Hartson joined Setanta Sports as a pundit for the 2008–09 season, as part of the broadcaster's coverage of the Scottish Premier League. A Welsh speaker, Hartson appears regularly as a studio guest on S4C's Sgorio. He was also a regular pundit on ITV's coverage of the FA Cup until ITV lost the rights to the competition at the end of the 2013/14 season, and often appears on BBC Radio 5 Live's coverage of both Premier League and Champions League games as a match summariser. In 2011 Hartson was appointed part-time coach with Newport County. In 2016, he joined BT Sport to provide analysis on the newly launched BT Sport Score.

Personal life
In July 2009 Hartson received chemotherapy after being diagnosed with testicular cancer which had spread to his brain. It was later reported the cancer had spread to his lungs and that he remained in a "critical condition" following emergency surgery. The treatment was successful and by December of that year it was reported that the cancer had been virtually eradicated from Hartson's body although he would have more surgery and treatment to come. Hartson is a lifelong Swansea City supporter.

Career statistics

Club

International

Honours
Arsenal
UEFA Cup Winners' Cup runner-up: 1994–95

Celtic
Scottish Premier League: 2001–02, 2003–04, 2005–06
Scottish Cup: 2003–04, 2004–05
Scottish League Cup: 2005–06

Individual
Welsh Footballer of the Year: 1998, 2001, 2003
PFA Scotland Players' Player of the Year: 2005
SFWA Footballer of the Year: 2005
FAI International Personality: 2016

References
General
 

Specific

External links
 John Hartson on Twitter
 
 Playing Record at Celtic at FitbaStats

1975 births
Living people
Footballers from Swansea
Welsh footballers
Wales youth international footballers
Wales under-21 international footballers
Wales international footballers
Association football forwards
Luton Town F.C. players
Arsenal F.C. players
West Ham United F.C. players
Wimbledon F.C. players
Coventry City F.C. players
Celtic F.C. players
West Bromwich Albion F.C. players
Norwich City F.C. players
Premier League players
English Football League players
Scottish Premier League players
British association football commentators
People educated at Ysgol Gyfun Gŵyr
Bards of the Gorsedd
Scottish league football top scorers
Welsh autobiographers
Welsh-language broadcasters
Newport County A.F.C. non-playing staff
Livingston F.C. non-playing staff